The canton of Schaffhausen, also canton of Schaffhouse is the northernmost canton of Switzerland. The principal city and capital of the canton is Schaffhausen. The canton's territory is divided into three non-contiguous segments, where German territory reaches the Rhine. The large central part, which includes the capital, in turn separates the German exclave of Büsingen am Hochrhein from the rest of Germany.

History 

Schaffhausen was a city-state in the Middle Ages; it is documented that it struck its own coins starting in 1045. It was then documented as Villa Scafhusun. Around 1049, Count Eberhard von Nellenburg founded a Benedictine monastery which led to the development of a community. This community achieved independence in 1190. In 1330, the town lost not only all its lands but also its independence to the Habsburgs. In 1415, the Habsburg Duke Frederick IV of Austria sided with the Antipope John XXIII at the Council of Constance, and was banned by the Emperor Sigismund. 

As a result of the ban and Frederick's need of money, Schaffhausen was able to buy its independence from the Habsburgs in 1418. The city allied with six of the Swiss confederates in 1454 and allied with a further two (Uri and Unterwalden) in 1479. Schaffhausen became a full member of the Old Swiss Confederation in 1501. 

The first railroad came to Schaffhausen in 1857. In 1944, Schaffhausen suffered from a bombing raid by United States Army Air Forces planes that accidentally strayed from Germany into neutral Switzerland.

The cantonal constitution was written in 1876 and revised in 1895. The distinctive coat of arms bears the Schaffhauser Bock (Billy Goat of Schaffhausen).

Geography

Schaffhausen is the northernmost canton of Switzerland and lies almost entirely on the right bank of the Rhine, with only part of Stein am Rhein on the left bank. Most of the rest of the canton,  (about 10%), is developed, while only  (1.3%) of the canton is unproductive (rivers, lakes or mountains).

The canton's territory is divided into three non-contiguous segments where German territory reaches the Rhine. The large central part, which includes the capital Schaffhausen, in turn partially (along with territory of two neighbouring cantons, separates the German exclave of Büsingen am Hochrhein from the rest of Germany. The small exclave of Rüdlingen-Buchberg lies to the southwest, and the third part contains Ramsen and Stein am Rhein to the east. With the exception of Vor der Brugg, part of Stein am Rhein, all three segments are separated from the rest of Switzerland by the Rhine.

The canton of Schaffhausen is bordered by the Swiss cantons of Zurich and Thurgau, as well as the German districts of Waldshut, Schwarzwald-Baar-Kreis and Konstanz, Baden-Württemberg.

Most of the canton lies on a plateau dominated by the Hoher Randen. The slopes of the mountain are gentle towards the south where it reaches the Rhine valley. Short and narrow valleys intersect these gentle slopes. The Klettgau is one such valley.

The Rhine Falls are the largest waterfalls in Europe and lie on the border of the cantons of Schaffhausen and Zürich.

Municipalities

There are 26 municipalities in the canton .

 Bargen
 Beggingen
 Beringen
 Buch
 Buchberg
 Büttenhardt
 Dörflingen
 Gächlingen
 Hallau
 Hemishofen
 Lohn
 Löhningen
 Merishausen
 Neuhausen am Rheinfall
 Neunkirch
 Oberhallau
 Ramsen
 Rüdlingen
 Schaffhausen
 Schleitheim
 Siblingen
 Stein am Rhein
 Stetten
 Thayngen
 Trasadingen
 Wilchingen

Merger
 In 1947, the municipality Buchthalen merged into Schaffhausen.
 In 1964, the municipality Herblingen merged into Schaffhausen.
 In 2004, the municipality Barzheim merged into Thayngen.
 In 2005, the municipality Osterfingen merged into Wilchingen.
 On 1 January 2009, the municipalities Altdorf, Bibern, Hofen, and Opfertshofen merged into Thayngen.
 In 2009, the municipality Hemmental merged into Schaffhausen.
 In 2013, the municipality Guntmadingen merged into Beringen.

Demographics
, the population included 16,323 foreigners, or about 21.9% of the total population. The German language and Protestant faith predominate. The majority of the population is Protestant (50%) while a large minority is Roman Catholic (24%).

Politics

Cantonal government
The legislature is the Cantonal Council (Kantonsrat) of Schaffhausen, which consists of 60 members elected proportionally every four years. Until 2008, it consisted of 80 members.

The executive branch is the Government Council (Regierungsrat), which consists of 5 members elected every four years.

Federal election results

 FDP before 2009, FDP.The Liberals after 2009
 "*" indicates that the party was not on the ballot in this canton.

Compulsory Voting
Swiss citizens who live in the canton of Schaffhausen are required to vote in elections. Compulsory voting never existed on the national level in Switzerland. It was introduced in several cantons starting in the late 19th century. In 1974, it was abolished everywhere except in Schaffhausen. Citizens who do not vote have to pay a small fine.

Economy
Schaffhausen is a part of the Zürcher Wirtschaftsraum (Zurich economic region) and the canton's economy is well integrated with that of the wider region.

Well-regarded white Riesling wine is grown here as well as several other varieties. The main industries, however, are the production of machinery and metal goods. There is also watch making and jewellery. Minor industrial branches are textiles, leather goods, glass, cement, paper and chemicals. There is a brewery in the canton.

At Rheinau there is a hydro electrical power plant generating electricity for the canton and for export. Major electricity customers are the chemical industry in Rheinfelden and the aluminium plant at Neuhausen am Rheinfall. The city of Schaffhausen also uses much of the electricity produced at Rheinau.

Schaffhausen lies on the busy Milan-Zurich-Stuttgart rail line which is serviced by trains from both the Swiss Federal Railways and German Railways.

The largest companies are Tyco International, Tyco Electronics, SIG, Georg Fischer AG, International Watch Company and Cilag AG.

Transportation

Bus

The neighboring towns of Schaffhausen and Neuhausen am Rheinfall share a municipal bus network with frequent services (see: urban buses in Schaffhausen and Neuhausen).

There are several regional bus services that link towns and villages in the canton of Schaffhausen with each other or with towns in the adjacent canton of Zurich and nearby German territory, respectively. Bus services 21–25 and lines 630 and 634 (the latter two to villages in the northern part of canton of Zürich) all depart from the forecourt of Schaffhausen railway station in Schaffhausen. In addition, bus line 33 (7349) connects villages in the eastern part of the canton of Schaffhausen with Singen (Hohentwiel) (some courses continue to Konstanz) in Germany. Line 675 connects the villages of Rüdlingen and Buchberg in the southern part of the canton of Schaffhausen with Rafz and Henggart (both are in the canton of Zürich), respectively. Route 825 links Stein am Rhein in the eastern part of the canton of Schaffhausen with Frauenfeld, the capital of the canton of Thurgau.

The regional bus lines are as follows (railway stations in bold letters):

Nighttime Bus
On weekends, there are night bus services operating on regional bus routes after midnight.

Train

Schaffhausen railway station is also served by InterCity (IC) and RegioExpress (RE) trains of Swiss Federal Railways (SBB CFF FFS), and Interregio-Express (IRE) and IC trains of Deutsche Bahn (DB). Train services are as follows (as of December 2022):

Schaffhausen station
  (DB/SBB CFF FFS):  –  –  (hourly service)
  (SBB CFF FFS):   –  –  –  (hourly service)
  (DB):  –  – Friedrichshafen-Hafen (hourly service)
  (St. Gallen S-Bahn):  –  –  –  –  –  (half-hourly service)
  (Zürich S-Bahn):  –  –  –  (hourly/half-hourly service)
  (Zürich S-Bahn):  –  –  –  (hourly service)
  (Zürich S-Bahn):  –  –  –  –  –  (hourly service)
  (Zürich S-Bahn):  –  (hourly service)
 :   –  (half-hourly service)
  (Schaffhausen S-Bahn):  –  (hourly service)
  (Schaffhausen S-Bahn):  –  (half-hourly service)

Herblingen and Thayngen stations
  (Zürich S-Bahn):   –  –  –  –  –  –  (hourly service)
  (Schaffhausen S-Bahn):  –  –  –  –  (half-hourly service)

Neuhausen station
  (Zürich S-Bahn):  –  –  –  –  (hourly/half-hourly service)
  (Zürich S-Bahn):  –  –  –  –  (hourly service)
  (Zürich S-Bahn):   –  –  –  –  –  –  (hourly service)
  (Zürich S-Bahn):  –  –  (hourly service)
  (Schaffhausen S-Bahn):  –  –  (hourly service)

Neuhausen Rheinfall station
  (Zürich S-Bahn):  –  –  –  –  (hourly/half-hourly service)
  (Schaffhausen S-Bahn):  –  –  (half-hourly service)

Neuhausen Badischer Bahnhof, Beringerfeld, Beringen, Neunkirch, Wilchingen-Hallau and Trasadingen stations 
  (Schaffhausen S-Bahn):   – Neuhausen Badischer Bahnhof –  – Beringen Badischer Bahnhof –  –  –  –  (half-hourly service)

Stein am Rhein station
  (St. Gallen S-Bahn):  –  –  –  –  –  (half-hourly service)
  (Zürich S-Bahn):  –  (half-hourly service)

Boat
During warmer seasons (April to October), there are regular boat trips by the Schweizerische Schifffahrtsgesellschaft Untersee und Rhein (URh) on the River Rhine (High Rhine) between Schifflände in Schaffhausen and Kreuzlingen (Lake Constance) via Stein am Rhein.

Notes and references

External links 

 Official site 
 Archives 
 Official statistics
 Digitized Edition of Chronik der Stadt und Landschaft Schaffhausen, in German, 1884–1910, at E-rara
 

 
Cantons of Switzerland
Cantons of the Helvetic Republic
15th-century establishments in the Old Swiss Confederacy
1450s establishments in the Holy Roman Empire
1454 establishments in Europe